Bottoms Up may refer to:

Music
"Bottoms Up" (Brantley Gilbert song), 2013
Bottoms Up (Illinois Jacquet album), 1968
"Bottoms Up" (Nickelback song) from Nickelback's album Here and Now
Bottoms Up (Obie Trice album), 2012
"Bottoms Up" (Trey Songz song), 2010
Bottoms Up!, a 1959 album by jazz group The Three Sounds
"Bottoms Up", a song by Keke Palmer from her debut album So Uncool
"Bottoms Up!", track four on Van Halen's album Van Halen II

Film and television
Bottoms Up (1934 film), a 1934 musical comedy film
Bottoms Up (1960 film), starring Jimmy Edwards
Bottoms Up (2006 film), a film starring Paris Hilton
'S Up, the fifth episode of the first series of British sitcom Bottom

Other uses
Bottoms Up Club, a bar in Hong Kong

See also
Bottom-up (disambiguation)
Top-down (disambiguation)